Parastenolechia issikiella is a moth of the family Gelechiidae. It is found in Japan and Korea.

The wingspan is 11–14 mm. The forewings are creamy white irrorated with whitish ochreous scales beyond the basal area. There are three distinct dark markings overlaid with raised scales at the base and two dark scale tufts on the antemedian fascia. Beneath these are large brown patches expanded to the dorsum, forming a triangle. Other dark fuscous markings are found on the tornus. The hindwings are grey.

References

Moths described in 1961
Parastenolechia